William Catton may refer to:

William Catton (cricketer) (1865–1939), South African cricketer
William Catton (MP) for Winchelsea (UK Parliament constituency)
William R. Catton Jr. (1926–2015), American environmental sociologist and human ecologist
William H. Catton (fl. 1890–1920), American professional carom billiards player